The Fair Play Project (Projeto Jogo Justo, in Portuguese) is an initiative that has the objective of reducing the tax burden on imported video games in Brazil, which is around 72.18%.

Goals
The intention is to show, by providing a report based on commercial information from developers and shopkeepers, that the Brazilian gaming market has a huge potential. As comparison, Mexico will be mentioned, where the gaming market grew eight times after its tax burden was reduced.

The Fair Play Project aims to reduce the price of games, gaming devices and their peripherals, thereby increasing the final consumer's contact with games, a form of culture increasingly widespread in the world. Therefore, the Brazilian market will develop along with the possibility of more producers settling in Brazil, generating, gradually, more employments on this sector of economy.

History
Founded by Moacyr Alves Jr., the Fair Play Project was created by an independent political, economic and profit generating community. It began to take shape in the second half of 2010 and will be submitted to the Brazilian IRS in November. During a meeting in Brasilia, it'll be explained the benefits of reducing the tax burden over game's sold in Brazil, which would cause the games to go from R$ 250,00 (~U$ 145) to R$ 99,00 (~U$ 57), approximately. If approved by the IRS, the project may come into operation at the beginning of 2011.

Support
Among the companies that officially support the Fair Play Project there are big retailers such as Walmart and Ponto Frio, as well as developers, blogs, and other organizations related to the videogames industry, such as:

 Konami
 Square Enix
 Blizzard Entertainment
 Electronic Arts
 THQ
 Activision
 Take Two Interactive Software
 Hudson Soft

References

Political organisations based in Brazil
Video game organizations